Johan Erik Forsström (1775–1824) was a Swedish pastor and naturalist from the province of Dalarna. The plant genus Forsstroemia from the family Leptodontaceae is named after him.

He studied at the University of Uppsala, where one of his instructors was naturalist Carl Peter Thunberg (1743–1828). In 1800, he accompanied Göran Wahlenberg (1780–1851) on an expedition through Fennoscandia, where he performed entomological and botanical investigations. On the trip he maintained a journal, and in 1917 details of the expedition were published in a book titled I Norrlandsstäder och Lapplandsbygd År 1800. John Erik Forsströms dagbok öfver resan i Norrland och Finnmarken 1800 och i Roslagen 1801.

From 1802 until 1815, Forsström was assigned as pastor in Saint Barthélemy of the Leeward Islands, where he also worked collecting botanical specimens. Afterwards he returned to Sweden, where he died in 1824 at Munktorp, located near the town of Köping.

References 
 Johan Erik Forsström i Fjordarnas Land 
 University of Gottingen- Search the Index Collectorum (biographical information)

1775 births
1824 deaths
People from Dalarna
Swedish naturalists
Swedish botanists
Uppsala University alumni